The Selfish Giant can refer to:

 One of the five stories in the collection The Happy Prince and Other Tales (1888) by Oscar Wilde.
 The Selfish Giant (1972 film), Canadian animated film adaptation
 The Selfish Giant (2013 film), British film
 "The Selfish Giant" (song), by Damon Albarn from the album Everyday Robots
 The Selfish Giant, a 1983 ballet with music by Graeme Koehne